Somaleh (also Romanized as Somāleh; also known as Simāleh) is a city in Aghili District, Gotvand County, Khuzestan Province, Iran. At the 2006 census, its population was 1,430, in 298 families.

References 

Populated places in Gotvand County
Cities in Khuzestan Province